The 1915 Fitzgibbon Cup was the fourth staging of the Fitzgibbon Cup since its establishment by the Gaelic Athletic Association in 1912. University College Dublin hosted the cup on 2 March 1915.

University College Cork were the defending champions.

On 2 March 1915, University College Dublin won the Fitzgibbon Cup after beating University College Cork by 6–00 to 3–00 in the final. This was their second cup title overall and their first title since 1912.

Teams

University College Galway did not field a team, meaning that University College Cork and University College Dublin were the only participants. Because of this, the round robin format was abolished and just one game was played to determine the cup winners.

Results

Final

References

Fitzgibbon
Fitzgibbon Cup